The Swimming competition of the 24th Summer Universiade was August 9–14, 2007 in Bangkok, Thailand. It consisted of 40 long course (50m) events (20 male, 20 female).

Participating nations
Swimmers from 68 nations competed in the 2007 World University Games, coming from:

Results

Men's events

Legend:

Women's events

Legend:

Medal standings

See also
2007 in swimming

References

 World University Games Day 1 - swimmingworldmagazine.com
 World University Games Day 2 - swimmingworldmagazine.com
 World University Games Day 3 - swimmingworldmagazine.com
 World University Games Day 4 - swimmingworldmagazine.com
 World University Games Day 5 - swimmingworldmagazine.com
 World University Games Day 6 - swimmingworldmagazine.com

2007 Summer Universiade
Universiade
Swimming at the Summer Universiade